These players have appeared in at least one regular season or postseason game for the Tennessee Titans franchise of the National Football League (NFL). It also includes players of the Houston Oilers and the Tennessee Oilers before the franchise was named the Titans.

A

Robert Abraham
Tom Ackerman
Ola Adeniyi
Xavier Adibi
Al Afalava
Samaji Adi Akili
Mike Akiu
Allen Aldridge
Kevin Aldridge
Melvin Aldridge
Dan Alexander
Willie Alexander
Dalva Allen
Earl Allen
Gary Allen
George Allen
Patrick Allen
Colin Allred
Jeff Alm
Mack Alston
Eugene Amano
Jace Amaro
Ken Amato
George Amundson
Billy Guy Anderson
Gary Anderson
Herbie Anderson
James Anderson
Warren Anderson
Antonio Andrews
Scott Appleton
Mike Archie
Adger Armstrong
Walt Arnold
Jack Atchason
Bob Atkins
James Atkins
Josh Aubrey
Denico Autry
Hank Autry
Donnie Avery
Steve Avery
Akeem Ayers

B

Gene Babb
Jason Babin
Jordan Babineaux
Harold Bailey
Patrick Bailey
Ed Baker
Jesse Baker
Johnny Baker
Melvin Baker
Eric Bakhtiari
Dave Ball
Tony Banfield
Chuck Banks
Robert Banks
Mike Barber
Chris Barclay
Brandon Barden
Pete Barnes
Tomur Barnes
Micheal Barrow
David Bass
Glenn Bass
Daren Bates
Cameron Batson
Jackie Battle
Steve Baumgartner
Byron Beams
Pete Beathard
Braden Beck
Tony Beckham
Jim Beirne
Billy Bell
Byron Bell
Jacob Bell
George Belotti
Drew Bennett
Duane Benson
Bruce Bergey
Eddie Berlin
Elvin Bethea
David Beverly
Ron Billingsley
Gregg Bingham
Craig Birdsong
Rob Bironas
Blaine Bishop
Sonny Bishop
Angelo Blackson
Joe Blahak
Valentino Blake
George Blanda
Sid Blanks
Khari Blasingame
LeGarrette Blount
Colby Bockwoldt
Rocky Boiman
Michael Booker
Breon Borders
Keith Bostic
Ron Botchan
Scott Boucher
Joe Bowden
Garland Boyette
Danny Brabham
Brett Brackett
Craig Bradshaw
John Brantley
Robert Brazile
Aaron Brewer
Bobby Brezina
Tom Briehl
Beau Brinkley
Kenny Britt
Jerry Broadnax
Billy Brooks
Leo Brooks
A. J. Brown
Chris Brown
Curtis Brown
Don Brown
Gary Brown
Jayon Brown
Larry Brown
Reggie Brown
Sonny Brown
Steve Brown
Tony Brown (born 1970)
Tony Brown (born 1980)
Zach Brown
Domingo Bryant
Steve Bryant
Randy Bullock
Keith Bulluck
Kaelin Burnett
Ode Burrell
Ken Burrough
Al Burton
Kendrick Burton
Frank Bush
Malcolm Butler
Skip Butler
Marion Butts
Kevin Byard
Isaac Byrd
Richard Byrd

C

Jeremy Cain
Bryan Caldwell
Tyrone Calico
Rocky Calmus
Rich Camarillo
Earl Campbell
Tommie Campbell
Woody Campbell
Billy Cannon
Cody Carlson
Rob Carpenter
Chris Carr
Levert Carr
Josh Carraway
John Carrell
Ed Carrington
Ronnie Carroll
Johnny Carson
David Carter
Kevin Carter
Pat Carter
Larry Carwell
Jurrell Casey
Dave Casper
Matt Cassel
Rich Caster
Toby Caston
Ronnie Caveness
Chuck Cecil
Frank Chamberlin
Chris Chandler
John Charles
B. W. Cheeks
Ray Childress
Ralph Cindrich
Boobie Clark
Leroy Clark
Jared Clauss
Zach Clayton
Doug Cline
Charles Clinton
Jadeveon Clowney
Rich Coady
David Cobb
Eric Cobble
Chase Coffman
Dylan Cole
Lee Cole
Linzy Cole
Chris Coleman
Pat Coleman
Ronnie Coleman
Kerry Collins
Doug Colman
Greg Comella
Dick Compton
Will Compton
Jack Conklin
Sean Conover
Anthony Cook
Jared Cook
Rayford Cooks
Joe Cooper
Jorge Cordova
John Corker
Kamalei Correa
Mark Cotney
Al Cowlings
Morgan Cox
Perrish Cox
Donnie Craft
Dobie Craig
Casey Cramer
Jack Crawford
Phil Croyle
Dane Cruikshank
Alge Crumpler
Dwayne Crutchfield
Yannik Cudjoe-Virgil
Curley Culp
Ed Culpepper
Dick Cunningham
Zach Cunningham
Rennie Curran
Bill Currier
Bill Curry
Gary Cutsinger
Jonathan Cyprien

D

Trevor Daniel
Alvis Darby
Chris Darrington
Mitch Daum
Greg Davidson
Kenny Davidson
Pete Davidson
Anthony Davis
Austin Davis
Bob Davis
Bruce Davis
Charlie Davis
Chris Davis
Corey Davis
Donnie Davis
Hall Davis
John Davis
Marvin Davis
Mike Davis
Nate Daivs
Willie Davis
Dalyn Dawkins
Joe Dawkins
Doug Dawson
Keyunta Dawson
Rhett Dawson
Jimmy Dean
Eric Decker
Al Del Greco
Tom Dempsey
Kyle DeVan
Willard Dewveall
Matt Dickerson
Lynn Dickey
Bo Dickinson
John Diettrich
Zac Diles
Gennaro DiNapoli
Johnnie Dirden
Cris Dishman
Joe Dixon
Kevin Dodd
Kirk Dodge
Tom Domres
Jeff Donaldson
Kevin Donnalley
Jon Dorenbos
Andy Dorris
Anthony Dorsett
Harry Douglas
Jamil Douglas
John Douglas
Marques Douglas
Chris Dressel
Willie Drewrey
Elbert Drungo
Mike Dukes
Mike Dumas
Brian Duncan
Curtis Duncan
Tommy Duniven
Anthony Dunn
Bud Dupree
Ryan Durand
Kenneth Durden
Kris Durham
Andre Dyson
Kevin Dyson
Nick Dzubnar

E

Larry Eaglin
Biren Ealy
Bo Eason
Irv Eatman
Tracey Eaton
Scott Eccles
Mike Echols
Dominique Edison
Emmett Edwards
Lavar Edwards
Stan Edwards
Pannel Egboh
Larry Elkins
Rich Ellender
Aaron Elling
Ken Ellis
Hicham El-Mashtoub
Jimbo Elrod
Keith Embray
Justin Ena
Bob Evans
Darren Evans
Darrynton Evans
Josh Evans
Norm Evans
Rashaan Evans
Nick Eyre

F

Leonard Fairley
Eric Fairs
Stan Fanning
Mike Fanucci
Matthias Farley
Miller Farr
Brett Faryniarz
Anthony Fasano
Staley Faulkner
Greg Favors
Gene Ferguson
Vagas Ferguson
Angelo Fields
Sharif Finch
Cortland Finnegan
Anthony Firkser
Bryce Fisher
Ed Fisher
Jason Fisk
Dez Fitzpatrick
Ryan Fitzpatrick
John Flannery
Troy Fleming
Don Floyd
Malcolm Floyd
David Fluellen
Moise Fokou
Bernard Ford
Henry Ford
Jacob Ford
D'Onta Foreman
Eddie Foster
Jerome Foster
Jalston Fowler
Jerry Fowler
Ryan Fowler
Scott Fox
Doug France
Jerrell Franklin
Charley Frazier
Wayne Frazier
Willie Frazier
Mike Frederick
Solomon Freelon
Dick Frey
Toni Fritsch
John Frongillo
Vincent Fuller
William Fuller
Kristian Fulton
Tom Funchess
Will Furrer

G

Blaine Gabbert
Justin Gage
Andy Gallik
Quinton Ganther
Teddy Garcia
Gilbert Gardner
Rich Gardner
Gary Garrison
Mark Gehring
Justin Geisinger
Eddie George
Spencer George
Roy Gerela
Willie Germany
Brandon Ghee
Jimmie Giles
David Givens
Ernest Givins
Freddy Glick
Phil Glover
Randall Godfrey
Mike Golic
Tom Goode
Zaviar Gooden
Brian Goodman
Amon Gordon
Bobby Gordon
Richard Gordon
Jeff Gossett
Stephen Gostkowski
Rick Graf
Aaron Graham
Daniel Graham
Shayne Graham
Hoyle Granger
Wes Grant
Jerry Gray
Ken Gray
Leon Gray
Mel Gray
Gary Greaves
Dave Green
Mike Green
Sammy Green
Dorial Green-Beckham
Shonn Greene
Bob Gresham
Larry Griffin
Michael Griffin
John Grimsley
Bill Groman
Jeff Groth
Quentin Groves
Sam Gruneisen
Gregg Guenther
Paul Guidry
Buzz Guy
John Guzik

H

John Hadl
Derek Hagan
Mac Haik
Mike Halapin
Ahmard Hall
Carlos Hall
Kenneth Hall
Lemanski Hall
Bob Hamm
Travis Hannah
Don Hardeman
Edd Hargett
Ronnie Harmon
Jamie Harper
Nick Harper
Brandon Harris
Corey Harris
DaJohn Harris
Jackie Harris
Leonard Harris
Leroy Harris
Odie Harris
Tuff Harris
Ben Hartsock
Carter Hartwig
Justin Hartwig
Claude Harvey
Matt Hasselbeck
Derrick Hatchett
Dennis Havig
Chris Hawkins
Lavelle Hawkins
Nat Hawkins
Jovan Haye
Jim Hayes
William Hayes
Conway Hayman
Alvin Haymond
Albert Haynesworth
Jerry Helluin
Thomas Henderson
Steve Hendrickson
Charley Hennigan
Chris Henry
Derrick Henry
Travis Henry
Craig Hentrich
Bill Herchman
Kelly Herndon
Dwone Hicks
Skip Hicks
W.K. Hicks
Alonzo Highsmith
Wally Highsmith
Darrell Hill
Drew Hill
Greg Hill
Kent Hill
Reynaldo Hill
Sammie Lee Hill
Dontrell Hilliard
Glen Ray Hines
Eddie Hinton
Terry Hoage
Fred Hoaglin
Reggie Hodges
Dalton Hoffman
Robert Holcombe
Henry Holligan ? (Harry Hooligan)
Cody Hollister
Kenny Holmes
Pat Holmes
Robert Holmes
Mike Holston
Rod Hood
Amani Hooker
Mitch Hoopes
Chris Hope
Andy Hopkins
Brad Hopkins
Roy Hopkins
Ken Houston
Leroy Howard
Ty Howard
Pat Howell
Ian Howfield
Marqueston Huff
Buddy Humphrey
Adam Humphries
Calvin Hunt
Daryl Hunt
Kevin Hunt
Herman Hunter
Justin Hunter
Torey Hunter
Ed Husmann
Steve Hutchinson

I

Pete Ittersagen
Chidi Iwuoma
Ryan Izzo

J

Adoree' Jackson
Andrew Jackson
Bob Jackson
Chris Jackson
Chris Jackson
Kenny Jackson
Ray Jackson
Steve Jackson
Arrike James
John James
Bobby Jancik
Pete Jaquess
Charles Jefferson
Thad Jefferson
Haywood Jeffires
Al Jenkins
DeRon Jenkins
Janoris Jenkins
Darius Jennings
Pete Johns
Al Johnson
Alex Johnson
Andre Johnson
Antonio Johnson
Austin Johnson
Benny Johnson
Billy Johnson
Byron Johnson
Charley Johnson
Chris Johnson
Doug Johnson
Ezra Johnson
John Henry Johnson
Kenny Johnson
Lee Johnson
Mike Johnson
Quinn Johnson
Rich Johnson
Richard Johnson
Robert Johnson
Steven Johnson
Tracy Johnson
Walter Johnson
Mark Johnston
Charlie Joiner
Tim Joiner
Lewis Jolley
Adam Jones
Ben Jones
Brandon Jones
DaQuan Jones
Gene Jones
Harris Jones
Jason Jones
Julio Jones
Lenoy Jones
Mark Jones
Mike Jones
Naquan Jones
Quintin Jones
Roger Jones
Sean Jones
Spike Jones
Terren Jones
Tony Jones
Victor Jones
Willie Jones
Johnathan Joseph
Larry Joyner
Willie Joyner

K

Kevin Kaesviharn
Kurt Kafentzis
Joshua Kalu
Brad Kassell
Bill Kay
Jevon Kearse
Stanford Keglar
Doug Kellermeyer
Dennis Kelly
Mike Kelley
Bob Kelly
Florian Kempf
Charlie Kendall
Ken Kennard
Mike Kennedy
Joey Kent
Randy Kerbow
Brett Kern
Billy Kidd
Terry Killens
Darius Kilgo
Terry Kinard
Keith Kinderman
Steve Kiner
Claude King
David King
Desmond King
Eric King
Kenny King
Erron Kinney
George Kinney
Ernie Kirk
Josh Kline
Jack Klotz
Karl Klug
Leander Knight
Kurt Knoff
Kris Kocurek
Mark Koncar
Scott Kozak
Jordan Kramer
Dave Krieg
Troy Kropog
Rod Kush

L

Travis LaBoy
Ernie Ladd
Kendall Lamm
Harold Landry
Dan Lanphear
Jack Laraway
Eric Larkin
Lamar Lathon
Jason Layman
Mike Leach
Monte Ledbetter
Jacky Lee
Jim LeMoine
Corey Levin
Jerry LeVias
Andy Levitre
Taylor Lewan
Darryll Lewis
Dion Lewis
Jess Lewis
Kendrick Lewis
Rich Lewis
Roderick Lewis
John Little
Jake Locker
Bennie Logan
James Logan
David Long Jr.
Kevin Long
Rien Long
Joe Looney
Daniel Loper
Ron Lou
Calvin Loveall
Calvin Lowry
Oliver Luck
Dennis Lundy
Deuce Lutui
Allen Lyday
Robert Lyles
Corey Lynch
Pratt Lyons

M

Isaiah Mack
Lynn Madsen
Don Maggs
Jesse Mahelona
Joe Majors
Kevin Malast
Archie Manning
Bobby Maples
Chester Marcol
Ed Marcontell
Marc Mariani
Marcus Mariota
Sen'Derrick Marks
Bud Marshall
Wilber Marshall
Charles Martin
Manny Martin
Matt Martin
Mike Martin
Lonnie Marts
Tyler Marz
Derrick Mason
Le'Shai Maston
Jason Mathews
Bruce Matthews
Kevin Matthews
Steve Matthews
John Matuszak
Carl Mauck
Matt Mauck
Kevin Mawae
Alvin Maxson
Tommy Maxwell
Ben Mayes
Ron Mayo
Damon Mays
Jason McAddley
Tre McBride
Brice McCain
Jim McCanless
Keith McCants
Justin McCareins
Colin McCarthy
Mike McCloskey
Dexter McCluster
Bubba McCollum
Brian McConnell
Jason McCourty
George McCullough
Wahoo McDaniel
Ron McDole
Keith McDonald
Bubba McDowell
Bud McFadin
Scott McGarrahan
Kanavis McGhee
James McKeehan
Bob McLeod
Racey McMath
Audray McMillian
Steve McNair
Todd McNair
Clifton McNeil
Gerald McNeil
Jeremy McNichols
Gerald McRath
Darryl Meadows
Johnny Meads
Shad Meier
Dudley Meredith
Jamon Meredith
Guido Merkens
Zach Mettenberger
John Meyer
Rich Michael
Doug Mikolas
Bill Miller
Clay Miller
Fred Miller
Josh Miller
Ralph Miller
John Henry Mills
Charlie Milstead
Christopher Milton
Frank Miotke
Donald Mitchell
Leroy Mitchell
Bryant Mix
Dontay Moch
Elijah Molden
Glenn Montgomery
Greg Montgomery
Mike Montgomery
Warren Moon
Collin Mooney
Ricky Moore
Zeke Moore
Eric Moran
Derrick Morgan
Karl Morgan
Larry Moriarty
Mike Moroski
Aric Morris
Dennit Morris
Ron Morrison
Mark Moseley
Randy Moss
Eric Moulds
Deiontrez Mount
Ryan Mouton
Bob Mrosko
Matthew Mulligan
Eric Mullins
Mike Munchak
Daniel Munyer
Larrell Murchison
Guy Murdock
Mike Murphy
Spain Musgrove
Bobby Myers

N

Terna Nande
Bob Naponic
Damien Nash
Brian Natkin
Lorenzo Neal
Joe Nedney
Kenny Neil
Benny Nelson
Ron Nery
Marshall Newhouse
Tony Newsom
Donnie Nickey
Gifford Nielsen
Kent Nix
Erik Norgard
Jim Norton
Jeremy Nunley

O

Antwan Odom
Sammy Odom
Neil O'Donnell
Michael Oher
Dave Olerich
Hubie Oliver
Eric Olsen
Benji Olson
Larry Onesti
Brian Orakpo
Bo Orlando
Kareem Orr
Bob Otto
Mike Otto
Wes Ours
Matt Overton
Joe Owens

P

Jordan Palmer
Nate Palmer
Juqua Parker
Willie Parker
Billy Parks
Dave Parks
Jeff Parks
Bernie Parrish
Cliff Parsley
Dan Pastorini
Jarrett Payton
Johnny Peacock
Alvin Pearman
Brent Pease
Willis Peguese
Kyle Peko
Micah Pellerin
Jay Pennison
Willis Perkins
Phil Perlo
Senorise Perry
Vernon Perry
Brett Petersmark
Mitch Petrus
Barry Pettyjohn
Perry Phenix
Shaun Phillips
Wes Phillips
Carl Pickens
Evan Pilgrim
Zach Piller
Allen Pinkett
Ropati Pitoitua
Hugh Pitts
Bernard Pollard
Bob Poole
Larry Poole
Tyrone Poole
Daryl Porter
Marico Portis
Dickie Post
Jeremiah Poutasi
Michael Preston
Roell Preston
Ron Pritchard
MyCole Pruitt

Q

Jeff Queen
David Quessenberry
Steve Quinn

R

Dillon Radunz
Marcus Randall
Tom Randall
Tate Randle
Wyatt Ray
Kalif Raymond
John Reaves
Alvin Reed
Brooks Reed
Leo Reed
Tom Regner
Jim Reid
George Reihner
Mike Reinfeldt
Mike Renfro
Darius Reynaud
Robert Reynolds
Jerry Rhome
Andy Rice
Floyd Rice
George Rice
Bucky Richardson
Mike Richardson
Rico Richardson
Charlie Rieves
Cody Riggs
Avon Riley
Javon Ringer
James Ritchey
Carl Roaches
Michael Roan
Derick Roberson
James Roberson
Guy Roberts
Tim Roberts
Bob Robertson
Marcus Robertson
Eddie Robinson
Paul Robinson
Rafael Robinson
Courtney Roby
Reggie Roby
Willie Rodgers
Chester Rogers
Samari Rolle
Jim Romano
Michael Roos
Tim Rossovich
Mike Rozier
Conrad Rucker
Council Rudolph
Jon Runyan
Marion Rushing
Derek Russell
Barrett Ruud
Logan Ryan

S

Rodger Saffold
Joe Salave'a
Harvey Salem
Ty Sambrailo
Greg Sampson
Chris Sanders
Scott Sanderson
Justin Sandy
Bishop Sankey
Cairo Santos
Ron Saul
Josh Savage
John Sawyer
Bo Scaife
Rich Scanlon
Jake Schifino
Shann Schillinger
Bob Schmidt
Bo Schobel
Nick Schommer
John Schuhmacher
Lance Schulters
Brian Schwenke
DeQuincy Scott
Jake Scott
Ed Scrutchins
Eugene Seale
Da'Norris Searcy
Coty Sensabaugh
Jeff Severson
Tajae Sharpe
Tim Shaw
Malcolm Sheppard
Visanthe Shiancoe
George Shirkey
Dainon Sidney
John Simerson
Chris Simms
Corey Simon
John Simon
Jeffery Simmons
Dave Simonson
Peter Sirmon
LeShaun Sims
Daryle Skaugstad
Tuzar Skipper
Buster Skrine
Webster Slaughter
Leroy Sledge
Sam Sloman
Donovan Small
O.J. Small
Tommie Smiley
Al Smith
Anthony Smith
Antowain Smith
Bob Smith
Bubba Smith
Dave Smith
Dave Smith
Doug Smith
Jonnu Smith
Larry Smith
Robaire Smith
Rusty Smith
Shaun Smith
Sid Smith
Tim Smith
Tody Smith
Tye Smith
Brian Sochia
Scott Solomon
Rich Sowells
Quinton Spain
Anthony Spears
Julian Spence
Chris Spencer
Cody Spencer
Jack Spikes
Ken Stabler
Daimion Stafford
Dennis Stallings
Josh Stamer
Justin Staples
Randy Starks
Al Steinfeld
Dean Steinkuhler
Greg Stemrick
Mike Stensrud
Mark Stepnoski
Craig Stevens
David Stewart
Rayna Stewart
Byron Stingily
Aaron Stinnie
Carel Stith
Luke Stocker
Terry Stoepel
Donnie Stone
Rich Stotter
Art Strahan
Art Stringer
Kevin Strong
Vince Stroth
Mark Studaway
Les Studdard
Jerry Sturm
Ryan Succop
Bob Suci
Walt Suggs
Kent Sullivan
Steve Superick
Phillip Supernaw
Mickey Sutton
Mike Sutton
Will Svitek
Geoff Swaim
Dick Swatland

T

Bob Talamini
Ryan Tannehill
Alex Tanney
Teair Tart
Steve Tasker
Jack Tatum
J.R. Tavai
Altie Taylor
Lionel Taylor
Malcolm Taylor
Taywan Taylor
Mike Teeter
Yancey Thigpen
Bill Thomas
Dee Thomas
Earl Thomas
Jemea Thomas
Rodney Thomas
Sloan Thomas
Stan Thomas
Rich Thomaselli
Emmuel Thompson
Lamont Thompson
Taylor Thompson
Ted Thompson
David Thornton
James Thornton
John Thornton
Andrae Thurman
Byron Thweatt
Mike Tilleman
Spencer Tillman
Bill Tobin
Charlie Tolar
Jim Tolbert
Billy Joe Tolliver
Spencer Toone
Morris Towns
Allen Trammel
Orville Trask
Brynden Trawick
Ben Troupe
Don Trull
Natu Tuatagaloa
Willie Tullis
Stephen Tulloch
Dwain Turner
Rob Turner
Robert Turner
Andrew Turzilli

U

Olen Underwood
Brent Urban

V

Kenny Vaccaro
Ira Valentine
Kyle Vanden Bosch
Vern Vanoy
Demetrin Veal
Craig Veasey
Fernando Velasco
Chris Verhulst
Alterraun Verner
Kevin Vickerson
Theo Viltz
Paul Vogel
Mike Voight
Billy Volek

W

Michael Waddell
Bobby Wade
Loyd Wainscott
Cameron Wake
Erik Walden
Delanie Walker
Denard Walker
Gary Walker
Joe Walker
Wayne Walker
Cooper Wallace
Ray Wallace
Fred Wallner
Herkie Walls
Ward Walsh
Joey Walters
Sam Walton
Seth Wand
Chance Warmack
Leon Washington
Nate Washington
Ted Washington, Sr.
Vic Washington
Ed Watson
B. W. Webb
George Webster
Eric Weems
Bucky Wegener
Mike Weger
Sammy Weir
Gary Wellman
Ray Wells
Terry Wells
Terrance West
Nick Westbrook-Ikhine
Hogan Wharton
Bob White
Jim White
John White
LenDale White
Lorenzo White
Bucky White
Charlie Whitehurst
C.L. Whittington
Doug Wilkerson
Armon Williams
Cary Williams
Damian Williams
David Williams
Doug Williams
Jamie Williams
Lee Williams
Maxie Williams
Mike Williams
Nick Williams
Oliver Williams
Paul Williams
Ralph Williams
Richard Williams
Roydell Williams
Sylvester Williams
Tank Williams
Todd Williams
Avery Williamson
Fred Willis
George Wilson
Isaiah Wilson
J.C. Wilson
Sheddrick Wilson
Tim Wilson
Tracy Wilson
Kamerion Wimbley
Jamie Winborn
Gary Wisener
Al Witcher
Will Witherspoon
John Wittenborn
Al Woods
Glen Woods
LeVar Woods
Robert Woods
Logan Woodside
Wesley Woodyard
Andre Woolfolk
Butch Woolfolk
Khalid Wooten
Barron Wortham
Blidi Wreh-Wilson
Elmo Wright
Kendall Wright
Alvin Wyatt
Frank Wycheck
Devon Wylie
Jarius Wynn

Y

Bashir Yamini
George Yarno
Jim Yeats
Almon Young
Bob Young
James Young
Robert Young
Vince Young

Z

Paul Zaeske
Tony Zendejas

External links
Tennessee Titans all-time roster

Tennessee Titans

players